Lincoln Paul McIlravy (born July 17, 1974 in Rapid City, South Dakota) from Philip, South Dakota is a businessman notable for his collegiate and Olympic wrestling accolades.

High School and College Career

McIlravy wrestled for Philip High School in Philip, SD where he won 5 state titles, going on to wrestle in college for the University of Iowa under celebrated coach Dan Gable. He was a three-time NCAA Division I champion, winning in 1993, 1994 and 1997. He was also a runner-up in 1995, losing to Steve Marianetti of University of Illinois.

International career 

McIlravy later competed for the United States in the 1998 and 1999 World Championships, 1999 Pan Am Games, and the 2000 Summer Olympics in Sydney, Australia, where he won the bronze medal in the Freestyle Welterweight competition.

As a competitor, McIlravy was known for his aggressive and innovative attacks, including the so-called "boot scoot" technique. For his numerous accolades and example of a student-athlete, McIlravy was inducted into the National High School Hall of Fame. In 2009, McIlravy was inducted into the National Wrestling Hall of Fame as a Distinguished Member.

Since retirement, McIlravy now owns hotels in Iowa and Nebraska.

References

Bibliography
 Zavoral, Nolan. 1997. A Season on the Mat. Simon & Schuster. 
 Hammond, Jairus K. 2005. The History of Collegiate Wrestling. National Wrestling Hall of Fame and Museum.

External links
 

1974 births
Living people
Wrestlers at the 2000 Summer Olympics
American male sport wrestlers
Olympic bronze medalists for the United States in wrestling
People from Haakon County, South Dakota
Sportspeople from Rapid City, South Dakota
Iowa Hawkeyes wrestlers
World Wrestling Championships medalists
Medalists at the 2000 Summer Olympics
Wrestlers at the 1999 Pan American Games
Pan American Games gold medalists for the United States
Pan American Games medalists in wrestling
Medalists at the 1999 Pan American Games
20th-century American people